Frederick Elwyn Jones, Baron Elwyn-Jones, CH, PC (24 October 1909 – 4 December 1989), known as Elwyn Jones, was a Welsh barrister and Labour politician.

Background and education
Elwyn Jones was born in Llanelli, Carmarthenshire, and read History for a year at the University of Wales, Aberystwyth, and then at Gonville and Caius College, Cambridge. He spent time in Germany in the 1930s.

An acting bombardier in the Royal Artillery (Territorial Army), he was commissioned as a second lieutenant on 23 December 1939. He ended his service as a major.

Legal career
He became a barrister and Recorder of Merthyr Tydfil. He was also a broadcaster and journalist. He served as junior British Counsel during the Nuremberg Trials, and led for the prosecution (Leading Prosecutor) at the Hamburg trial of Marshal Erich von Manstein in 1948.

In 1966, he led the prosecution of the Moors murderers, Ian Brady and Myra Hindley.

Political career
At the 1945 general election, he was elected as Labour Member of Parliament for Plaistow, east London. In 1950, he became MP for West Ham South, serving until 1974. In 1964, Elwyn Jones was sworn of the Privy Council and appointed Attorney General (receiving the customary knighthood) by Harold Wilson, a post he held until 1970.

In February 1974, he was once again elected to Parliament, now for Newham South, but left the House of Commons soon afterwards when he was made a life peer, as Baron Elwyn-Jones, of Llanelli in the County of Carmarthen and of Newham in Greater London. The resulting by-election allowed Nigel Spearing to re-enter Parliament as he had lost the Acton seat in the February election. He served as Lord Chancellor from 1974 to 1979, under Harold Wilson and James Callaghan. In 1976 he was made a Companion of Honour.

Personal life
In 1937, Elwyn Jones married Pearl "Polly" Binder, an artist from Manchester. The couple had three children: Josephine, Lou and Dan. Josephine became a researcher on Jacob Bronowski's TV series The Ascent of Man and married Francis Gladstone (a great-grandson of Prime Minister William Gladstone). Dan is an artist, collector of children's playground songs and human rights campaigner.

Elwyn Jones's brother, Idris (1900–1971), was captain of the Wales rugby union team in 1925, and was an industrial chemist who became Director General of Research Development for the National Coal Board.

Lord Elwyn-Jones died in December 1989, aged 80.

Arms

References

Further reading

External links

Llanelli Community Heritage Elwyn-Jones Blue Plaque
Lord Elwyn-Jones' appearance on Desert Island Discs
Lord Elwyn-Jones Papers at the National Library of Wales

|-

|-

|-

|-

|-

1909 births
1989 deaths
20th-century British lawyers
Alumni of Aberystwyth University
Alumni of Gonville and Caius College, Cambridge
Attorneys General for England and Wales
British Army personnel of World War II
Fellows of King's College London
Knights Bachelor
Labour Party (UK) MPs for English constituencies
Labour Party (UK) life peers
Lord chancellors of Great Britain
Members of Gray's Inn
Members of the Order of the Companions of Honour
Members of the Privy Council of the United Kingdom
Ministers in the Wilson governments, 1964–1970
People educated at Llanelli Boys' Grammar School
People from Llanelli
Politicians awarded knighthoods
Presidents of the Cambridge Union
Royal Artillery officers
Royal Artillery soldiers
UK MPs 1945–1950
UK MPs 1950–1951
UK MPs 1951–1955
UK MPs 1955–1959
UK MPs 1959–1964
UK MPs 1964–1966
UK MPs 1966–1970
UK MPs 1970–1974
UK MPs 1974
UK MPs who were granted peerages
Life peers created by Elizabeth II
Welsh barristers